Super Car was a small manufacturer of three-wheeled trucks based in Agios Vassileios, near Patras, Greece. 

It operated between 1968 and 1974, producing light trucks powered by 1300cc Volkswagen air-cooled engines. Two different models were produced.

References 
L.S. Skartsis, "Encyclopedia of Greek vehicles and aircraft", Achaikes Ekdoseis/Typorama, Patras, Greece (1995) 
L.S. Skartsis and G.A. Avramidis, "Made in Greece", Typorama, Patras, Greece (2003)  (republished by the University of Patras Science Park, 2007)

External links 
Super Car in Dutch Auto Catalog

Truck manufacturers of Greece
Companies based in Patras